Herbert du Parcq, Baron du Parcq, PC (5 August 1880 – 27 April 1949) was a British judge, who served as a law lord between 1946 and 1949.

Early life 
du Parcq was born in Saint Helier, Jersey in 1880, son of Clement Pixley du Parcq and Sophia Thoreau. He was distantly connected to Henry David Thoreau through his mother. He was educated at Victoria College, Jersey and Exeter College, Oxford (BA Literae Humaniores) (2nd class) and Jesus College, Oxford (BCL, senior scholar). He was president of the Oxford Union in 1902. He was called to the Bar by Middle Temple in 1906 and admitted to the Jersey Bar in the same year.

Career 
He became a specialist in commercial litigation in London, was appointed a King's Counsel in 1926 and was appointed Recorder for Portsmouth in 1928 and Recorder for Bristol in 1929. A mutiny in Dartmoor Prison on 24 January 1932 led to the setting up of a commission of enquiry under du Parcq. His report was considered satisfactory and he was rewarded with an appointment to the King's Bench Division as a judge, receiving the customary knighthood.

Invested to the Privy Council in 1938, du Parcq was Lord Justice of Appeal from 1938 to 1946. On 5 February 1946, he was appointed Lord of Appeal in Ordinary and was created a life peer with the title Baron du Parcq, of Grouville in the Island of Jersey.

During World War II, he chaired the Channel Islands Refugees Committee which raised funds, gave financial relief, distributed clothing, traced relatives and gave guidance and help to refugees. The UK government relied on the Committee for information on the Channel Islands and in September 1940 his first appeal for funds on the BBC's 'The Week's Good Cause' programme raised what was then a record result.

In 1946 he became chairman of a Royal Commission into justices of the peace. He was a member of the Permanent Court of Arbitration at The Hague, and was an Honorary Fellow of Exeter College and Jesus College.

du Parcq was also the author of a four-volume biography of David Lloyd George, published between 1911 and 1913, though for unknown reasons he avoided referring to it later in his life.

du Parcq died in a London nursing home on 27 April 1949.

Notable trials

Prosecution of the murder of Alice Thomas and others by Annie Hearn in June 1931.

Family 
In 1911 he married Lucy Renouf, from St Helier. They had two daughters, Helen and Catherine, and a son, John Renouf.

References

Obituary, The Times, 28 April 1949

External links
 

1880 births
1949 deaths
Du Parcq 
Members of the Privy Council of the United Kingdom
Members of the Judicial Committee of the Privy Council
Alumni of Exeter College, Oxford
Alumni of Jesus College, Oxford
People from Saint Helier
Members of the Permanent Court of Arbitration
Members of the Middle Temple
Knights Bachelor
Queen's Bench Division judges
People educated at Victoria College, Jersey
British biographers
Jersey lawyers
Presidents of the Oxford Union
British judges of international courts and tribunals
Lords Justices of Appeal
20th-century English judges
Life peers created by George VI